

This is a list of Church of England Measures, which are the legislation of the Church of England. Some of these measures may have been repealed. Since 1970, Measures have been made by the General Synod; prior to then they were made by its predecessor, the Church Assembly. Under the Church of England Assembly (Powers) Act 1919 (9 & 10 Geo. 5 c. 76), Measures have the same force as an Act of Parliament.

 indicates that a Measure is available to view at legislation.gov.uk.

Church of England Measures

|-
| {{|Union of Benefices Measure 1921|church|3|17-08-1921|archived=n|A Measure passed by the National Assembly of the Church of England to continue the operation of the Union of Benefices Act, 1919, for a further period of two years.}}
|-
| {{|Representation of the Laity (Amendment) Measure 1922|church|1|12-04-1922|archived=n|A Measure passed by the National Assembly of the Church of England to amend the Rules for the Representation of the Laity contained in the Schedule to the Constitution of the National Assembly of the Church of England.}}
|-
| {{|Pluralities Act 1838 (Amendment) Measure 1922|church|2|04-08-1922|archived=n|A Measure passed by the National Assembly of the Church of England to repeal Sections 52 and 53 of the Pluralities Act, 1838.}}
|-
| {{|Revised Tables of Lessons Measure 1922|church|3|04-08-1922|maintained=y|archived=n|A Measure passed by the National Assembly of the Church of England to amend the Law relating to the Tables of Lessons contained in the Prayer Book.}}
|-
| {{|Benefices Act 1898 (Amendment) Measure 1923|note1=|church|1|14-07-1924|archived=n|A Measure passed by the National Assembly of the Church of England to amend the Law relating to the Patronage of Benefices and to amend the Benefices Act, 1898.}}
|-
| {{|Union of Benefices Measure 1923|note1=|church|2|14-07-1924|archived=n|A Measure passed by the National Assembly of the Church of England to make provision for Unions of Benefices outside the City of London, for disunions, alteration of boundaries and other purposes, and for matters incidental thereto.}}
|-
| {{|Ecclesiastical Dilapidations Measure 1923|note1=|church|3|14-07-1924|maintained=y|archived=n|A Measure passed by the National Assembly of the Church of England to amend the Law with regard to Ecclesiastical Dilapidations, and for other purposes.}}
|-
| {{|Bishopric of Blackburn Measure 1923|note1=|church|4|14-07-1924|archived=n|A Measure passed by the National Assembly of the Church of England to provide for the foundation of a Bishopric of Blackburn.}}
|-
| {{|Diocese of Southwell (Division) Measure 1923|note1=|church|5|14-07-1924|archived=n|A Measure passed by the National Assembly of the Church of England to provide for the Division of the Diocese of Southwell, the Foundation of a Bishopric of Derby, for the transfer of certain patronages to the Bishop of Southwell, and for purposes connected therewith.}}
|-
| {{|Diocese of Winchester (Division) Measure 1923|note1=|church|6|01-08-1924|archived=n|A Measure passed by the National Assembly of the Church of England to provide for the division of the Diocese of Winchester, and for the Foundation of Bishoprics of Portsmouth and of Guildford.}}
|-
| {{|Interpretation Measure 1925|church|1|28-05-1925|maintained=y|archived=n|A Measure passed by the National Assembly of the Church of England to provide for the construction of the Constitution of the National Assembly of the Church of England referred to in the Church of England Assembly (Powers) Act, 1919, and for the construction and proof of Measures passed under that Act.}}
|-
| {{|Bishopric of Leicester Measure 1925|church|2|31-07-1925|archived=n|A Measure passed by the National Assembly of the Church of England to provide for the foundation of a Bishopric of Leicester.}}
|-
| {{|Diocesan Boards of Finance Measure 1925|church|3|22-12-1925|maintained=y|archived=n|A Measure passed by the National Assembly of the Church of England to make provision for the Powers, Duties and Constitution of Diocesan Boards of Finance.}}
|-
| {{|Brislington Parishes (Transfer) Measure 1926|church|1|26-03-1926|archived=n|A Measure passed by the National Assembly of the Church of England to transfer the parishes of Brislington Saint Luke and Brislington Saint Anne from the Diocese of Bath and Wells to the Diocese of Bristol, and for purposes connected therewith.}}
|-
| {{|Rural Deaneries of Pontefract and Hemsworth (Transfer) Measure 1926|church|2|26-03-1926|archived=n|A Measure passed by the National Assembly of the Church of England to transfer the Rural Deaneries of Pontefract and Hemsworth from the Diocese of York to the Diocese of Wakefield, to provide for additional honorary canonries in the Cathedral Church of Wakefield, and for purposes connected therewith.}}
|-
| {{|Parish of Manchester Division Act 1850 (Amendment) Measure 1926|church|3|29-04-1926|archived=n|A Measure passed by the National Assembly of the Church of England to sever the canonries in the Cathedral Church of Manchester from the benefices annexed thereto, and otherwise to amend the Parish of Manchester Division Act, 1850.}}
|-
| {{|Ecclesiastical Commissioners Measure 1926|church|4|15-07-1926|maintained=y|archived=n|A Measure passed by the National Assembly of the Church of England to amend the Ecclesiastical Commissioners Acts, 1840 and 1841, and the Ecclesiastical Commissioners Act, 1840, Amendment Act, 1885, and to make further provision for the augmentation of archdeaconries, for aiding the endowment funds of new bishoprics, for bishops' costs of legal proceedings, for the maintenance of Lambeth Palace, and the repair of other Episcopal Residences.}}
|-
| {{|First Fruits and Tenths Measure 1926|church|5|15-07-1926|maintained=y|archived=n|A Measure passed by the National Assembly of the Church of England to provide for the extinguishment or redemption of first fruits and tenths.}}
|-
| {{|Clergy Pensions Measure 1926|church|6|04-08-1926|archived=n|A Measure passed by the National Assembly of the Church of England to establish a system of Pensions for the Clergy (other than Diocesan Bishops), to provide for the transition from the Incumbents Resignation Acts, 1871 and 1887, to such system, and to effect changes in the constitution and management of the Clergy Pensions Institution.}}
|-
| {{|Episcopal Pensions Measure 1926|church|7|15-12-1926|archived=n|A Measure passed by the National Assembly of the Church of England to provide for Bishops' Pensions.}}
|-
| {{|Benefices (Ecclesiastical Duties) Measure 1926|church|8|15-12-1926|archived=n|A Measure passed by the National Assembly of the Church of England to consolidate and amend the law relating to the due performance of the Ecclesiastical Duties of Benefices, and to make provision for the Stipends of Curates appointed under the Measure and in certain other cases.}}
|-
| {{|Indian Church Measure 1927|church|1|23-11-1927|archived=n|A Measure passed by the National Assembly of the Church of England to provide for the dissolution of the legal union between the Church of England and the Church of England in India, and to make provisions consequential thereon.}}
|-
| {{|Clergy Pensions (Amendment) Measure 1927|church|2|23-11-1927|archived=n|A Measure passed by the National Assembly of the Church of England to amend the Clergy Pensions Measure, 1926.}}
|-
| {{|New Dioceses (Transitional Provisions) Measure 1927|church|3|23-11-1927|archived=n|A Measure passed by the National Assembly of the Church of England to make temporary provision for representation in the House of Laity and the constitution of Diocesan Conferences upon the foundation of new bishopricks, and for purposes connected therewith.}}
|-
| {{|Ecclesiastical Commissioners (Provision for Unbeneficed Clergy) Measure 1928|church|1|02-07-1928|archived=n|A Measure passed by the National Assembly of the Church of England to amend the Ecclesiastical Commissioners Act, 1840.}}
|-
| {{|Tithe (Administration of Trusts) Measure 1928|church|2|03-08-1928|maintained=y|archived=n|A Measure passed by the National Assembly of the Church of England to regulate the administration of the trusts affecting tithe rent-charge and other rent-charges, rents and payments in lieu of tithe vested in Queen Anne's Bounty in trust for incumbents of benefices, and for purposes connected therewith.}}
|-
| {{|Clergy Pensions (Amendment) Measure 1928|church|3|03-08-1928|archived=n|A Measure passed by the National Assembly of the Church of England to amend the Clergy Pensions Measure, 1926.}}
|-
| {{|Parochial Registers and Records Measure 1929|church|1|10-05-1929|archived=n|A Measure passed by the National Assembly of the Church of England to provide for the better care of Parochial Registers and other Records in Ecclesiastical custody, and the establishment of Diocesan Record Offices.}}
|-
| {{|Representation of the Laity Measure 1929|church|2|10-05-1929|archived=n|A Measure passed by the National Assembly of the Church of England to amend the Rules for the Representation of the Laity contained in the Schedule to the Constitution.}}
|-
| {{|Ecclesiastical Dilapidations (Amendment) Measure 1929|church|3|10-05-1929|maintained=y|archived=n|A Measure passed by the National Assembly of the Church of England to amend the Ecclesiastical Dilapidations Measure, 1923.}}
|-
| {{|Westminster Abbey Measure 1929|church|4|10-05-1929|archived=n|A Measure passed by the National Assembly of the Church of England to make further provision as to the apportionment of the income of the Dean and Chapter of Westminster.}}
|-
| {{|Parsonages Measure 1930|church|1|20-03-1930|archived=n|A Measure passed by the National Assembly of the Church of England to consolidate and amend the Law relating to the sale, purchase and improvement of Parsonage Houses.}}
|-
| {{|Archdeaconry of Surrey Measure 1930|church|2|20-03-1930|archived=n|A Measure passed by the National Assembly of the Church of England to provide for the disannexation from the Archdeaconry of Surrey of the Canonry in Winchester Cathedral now annexed thereto; for the suspension of the said Canonry; and for the foundation of Canonries in the Cathedral Churches of Guildford and Portsmouth and the endowment thereof out of the corporate property of the Dean and Chapter of Winchester.}}
|-
| {{|Marriage Measure 1930|church|3|20-03-1930|archived=n|A Measure passed by the National Assembly of the Church of England to enable marriages to be solemnized in any church which is the usual place of worship of the persons to be married or of either of them.}}
|-
| {{|Ecclesiastical Commissioners (Pensions of Church Estates Commissioners) Measure 1930|church|4|15-04-1930|archived=n|A Measure passed by the National Assembly of the Church of England to enable pensions to be granted to certain of the Church Estates Commissioners.}}
|-
| {{|Ecclesiastical Commissioners (Sodor and Man) Measure 1930|church|5|15-04-1930|maintained=y|archived=n|A Measure passed by the National Assembly of the Church of England to enable the Ecclesiastical Commissioners to make additional provision for the Cure of Souls in parishes in the Diocese of Sodor and Man.}}
|-
| {{|Clergy Pensions (Older Incumbents) Measure 1930|church|6|04-06-1930|archived=n|A Measure passed by the National Assembly of the Church of England to establish a system of Pensions for Older Incumbents, and for that purpose to amend the Incumbents Resignation Acts, 1871 and 1887, and the Clergy Pensions Measures, 1926 to 1928.}}
|-
| {{|Pluralities Measure 1930|church|7|01-08-1930|archived=n|A Measure passed by the National Assembly of the Church of England to amend the law relating to the holding of benefices in plurality, and for that purpose to extend the powers exerciseable under the Union of Benefices Measure, 1923.}}
|-
| {{|Benefices (Transfer of Rights of Patronage) Measure 1930|church|8|01-08-1930|maintained=y|archived=n|A Measure passed by the National Assembly of the Church of England to regulate the transfer of the Rights of Patronage of Benefices.}}
|-
| {{|Episcopal Pensions (Sodor and Man) Measure 1931|church|1|27-03-1931|archived=n|A Measure passed by the National Assembly of the Church of England to extend the Episcopal Pensions Measure, 1926, with modifications to the bishopric of Sodor and Man, and to make consequential provisions.}}
|-
| {{|Ecclesiastical Commissioners (Loans for Church Training Colleges) Measure 1931|church|2|27-03-1931|maintained=y|archived=n|A Measure passed by the National Assembly of the Church of England to enable the Ecclesiastical Commissioners to make or guarantee loans for purposes in connection with Church of England Training Colleges.}}
|-
| {{|Benefices (Exercise of Rights of Presentation) Measure 1931|church|3|08-07-1931|archived=n|A Measure passed by the National Assembly of the Church of England to regulate the exercise of rights of presentation to benefices.}}
|-
| {{|Channel Islands (Church Legislation) Measure 1931|church|4|08-07-1931|maintained=y|archived=n|A Measure passed by the National Assembly of the Church of England to make further provision for the application to the Channel Islands of Measures passed by the Church Assembly.}}
|-
| {{|Channel Islands (Representation) Measure 1931|church|5|08-07-1931|maintained=y|archived=n|A Measure passed by the National Assembly of the Church of England to provide for the representation of the Channel Islands in the House of Laity and in the Diocesan Conference of the Diocese of Winchester.}}
|-
| {{|Ecclesiastical Commissioners (Provision for Unbeneficed Clergy) Measure 1928 (Amendment) Measure 1931|church|6|08-07-1931|archived=n|A Measure passed by the National Assembly of the Church of England to amend the Ecclesiastical Commissioners (Provision for Unbeneficed Clergy) Measure, 1928.}}
|-
| {{|Cathedrals Measure 1931|church|7|08-07-1931|maintained=y|archived=n|A Measure passed by the National Assembly of the Church of England to establish and to define the functions, powers, and duties of the Cathedral Commissioners for England, to make provision with respect to the constitutions, the property and revenues, the statutes of cathedral churches and the patronage of the canonries therein, and in certain cases with respect to the election of bishops by the chapters thereof, to enable the Ecclesiastical Commissioners to make grants for the benefit of cathedral churches, and for purposes connected therewith.}}
|-
| {{|Benefices (Diocesan Boards of Patronage) Measure 1932|church|1|16-06-1932|archived=n|A Measure passed by the National Assembly of the Church of England to establish Diocesan Boards of Patronage.}}
|-
| {{|Benefices (Purchase of Rights of Patronage) Measure 1933|church|1|29-03-1933|archived=n|A Measure passed by the National Assembly of the Church of England to enable the Parochial Church Councils to purchase rights of patronage in certain cases.}}
|-
| {{|Wythenshawe Parishes (Transfer) Measure 1933|church|2|28-06-1933|archived=n|A Measure passed by the National Assembly of the Church of England to transfer the parish of Northenden and parts of the parishes of Baguley and Timperley from the Diocese of Chester to the Diocese of Manchester, and for purposes connected therewith.}}
|-
| {{|Parish of Manchester Revenues Measure 1933|church|3|28-07-1933|archived=n|A Measure passed by the National Assembly of the Church of England to allocate the Revenues of the Dean and Canons of the Cathedral or Collegiate and Parish Church of Manchester and for purposes connected therewith.}}
|-
| {{|Benefices (Sequestrations) Measure 1933|church|4|17-11-1933|maintained=y|archived=n|A Measure passed by the National Assembly of the Church of England to make further provision with regard to the administration of the property of vacant benefices and to confer certain powers upon sequestrators appointed under the Benefices (Ecclesiastical Duties) Measure, 1926.}}
|-
| {{|Clerical Disabilities Act 1870 (Amendment) Measure 1934|church|1|22-06-1934|maintained=y|archived=n|A Measure passed by the National Assembly of the Church of England to amend the Clerical Disabilities Act, 1870, by enabling clerks in Holy Orders who have availed themselves of that Act to resume the position of officiating ministers.}}
|-
| {{|Banns of Marriage Measure 1934|church|2|31-07-1934|archived=n|A Measure passed by the National Assembly of the Church of England to amend and declare the law relating to the publication of Banns of Marriage and for purposes connected therewith.}}
|-
| {{|Cathedrals (Amendment) Measure 1934|church|3|31-07-1934|archived=n|A Measure passed by the National Assembly of the Church of England to amend the law relating to Cathedral Churches.}}
|-
| {{|Diocese of Southwell (Transfer) Measure 1935|church|1|02-08-1935|archived=n|A Measure passed by the National Assembly of the Church of England to transfer the Diocese of Southwell from the Province of Canterbury to the Province of York.}}
|-
| {{|Farnham Castle Measure 1935|church|2|02-08-1935|archived=n|A Measure passed by the National Assembly of the Church of England to provide for the transfer to the Ecclesiastical Commissioners of so much of Farnham Castle as has been provided for an episcopal house of residence for the Bishopric of Guildford and for purposes connected therewith.}}
|-
| {{|Clergy Pensions (Amendment) Measure 1936|church|1|29-05-1936|archived=n|A Measure passed by the National Assembly of the Church of England to amend the Clergy Pensions Measures, 1926 to 1928.}}
|-
| {{|Union of Benefices (Amendment) Measure 1936|church|2|29-05-1936|archived=n|A Measure passed by the National Assembly of the Church of England to amend the Union of Benefices Measure, 1923, and for purposes connected therewith.}}
|-
| {{|Clergy Pensions (Widows and Dependants) Measure 1936|church|3|29-05-1936|archived=n|A Measure passed by the National Assembly of the Church of England to establish a scheme of pensions for the widows and dependants of the Clergy, and for that purpose to amend the Clergy Pensions Measures, 1926 to 1936.}}
|-
| {{|Cathedrals (Houses of Residence) Measure 1936|church|4|29-05-1936|archived=n|A Measure passed by the National Assembly of the Church of England to provide for the disposal by sale and otherwise of houses of residence of Deans and Canons of Cathedral Churches or for purposes connected therewith.}}
|-
| {{|Ecclesiastical Commissioners (Powers) Measure 1936|church|5|29-05-1936|maintained=y|archived=n|A Measure passed by the National Assembly of the Church of England to confer upon the Ecclesiastical Commissioners temporary power to give financial help for the provision of churches and other buildings for religious worship, and power to make better provision for the endowment of certain bishoprics: to amend and extend the provisions of the Ecclesiastical Leasing Acts: and to amend the Ecclesiastical Commissioners Measure, 1926, as to payment by the Ecclesiastical Commissioners of costs of certain legal proceedings.}}
|-
| {{|Queen Anne's Bounty (Powers) Measure 1937|church|1|18-02-1937|archived=n|A Measure passed by the National Assembly of the Church of England to establish a system of quarterly payments of income payable by Queen Anne's Bounty to incumbents of benefices, and to provide for the transfer to the Ecclesiastical Commissioners of funds held by Queen Anne's Bounty for the benefit of ecclesiastical corporations, and for purposes connected therewith.}}
|-
| {{|House of Laity (Co-opted Members) Measure 1937|church|2|06-05-1937|archived=n|A Measure passed by the National Assembly of the Church of England to enable the House of Laity to co-opt certain persons to be members of that House.}}
|-
| {{|Southwark Cathedral Measure 1937|church|3|01-07-1937|archived=n|A Measure passed by the National Assembly of the Church of England to establish a Constitution and Statutes for the Cathedral Church of Saint Saviour, Southwark, and for purposes connected therewith.}}
|-
| {{|Marriage (Licensing of Chapels) Measure 1938|church|1|13-04-1938|archived=n|A Measure passed by the National Assembly of the Church of England to remove doubts as to the power of bishops to license chapels in certain districts for the solemnization therein of certain marriages.}}
|-
| {{|Guildford Cathedral Measure 1938|church|2|13-04-1938|archived=n|A Measure passed by the National Assembly of the Church of England to transfer the dignity and status of the Cathedral of the Diocese of Guildford from the Church of the Holy Trinity in Guildford to the Church of the Holy Spirit in Guildford and for purposes connected therewith.}}
|-
| {{|Parsonages Measure 1938|church|3|23-06-1938|maintained=y|archived=n|A Measure passed by the National Assembly of the Church of England to consolidate and amend the law relating to the sale, purchase and improvement of parsonage houses and of other property belonging to benefices.}}
|-
| {{|Ecclesiastical Commissioners (Powers) Measure 1938|church|4|23-06-1938|maintained=y|archived=n|A Measure passed by the National Assembly of the Church of England to confer upon the Ecclesiastical Commissioners power to establish and fix parochial tables of fees for the performance of church offices and matters incidental thereto: to amend the Glebe Lands Act, 1888, and to make applicable to future sales under that Act the provisions of the Ecclesiastical Leasing Acts as to improvement of annual value: to give additional powers to the Ecclesiastical Commissioners as to the application of money arising from the sale of property of a benefice under the Ecclesiastical Leasing Acts or the Glebe Lands Act, 1888, and to enable them to rearrange charges on endowment of a benefice in favour of another benefice: to remove a doubt arising under the Union of Benefices Act, 1860: to enable to Ecclesiastical Commissioners to withdraw certain curate grants: to make provision for payment to the incumbents of benefices by regular quarterly instalments of such part of the income of their respective benefices as is received by them from the Ecclesiastical Commissioners: to give additional powers to the Ecclesiastical Commissioners in relation to funds available for the endowment of benefices and in relation to curate funds: and to amend section two of the Ecclesiastical Commissioners Act, 1850, as to the salaries payable to the Church Estates Commissioners.}}
|-
| {{|Liverpool City Churches Act 1897 (Amendment) Measure 1938|church|5|13-07-1938|archived=n|A Measure passed by the National Assembly of the Church of England to amend the Liverpool City Churches Act, 1897.}}
|-
| {{|Faculty Jurisdiction Measure 1938|church|6|13-07-1938|archived=n|A Measure passed by the National Assembly of the Church of England to amend the law relating to the issue of faculties out of ecclesiastical courts; to make better provision for giving effect to faculties so issued; to authorise the sale of books in certain parochial libraries under a faculty; to authorise archdeacons to issue certificates in certain cases; and for other purposes connected therewith.}}
|-
| {{|Queen Anne's Bounty (Powers) Measure 1939|church|1|28-04-1939|archived=n|A Measure passed by the National Assembly of the Church of England to confer upon Queen Anne's Bounty additional powers relating to the application of augmentation moneys and securities, the abatement and extinguishment of charges upon benefices, and other matters connected therewith.}}
|-
| {{|Ecclesiastical Officers Remuneration Measure 1939|church|2|28-04-1939|archived=n|A Measure passed by the National Assembly of the Church of England to provide for the establishment of tables of the fees to be taken by ecclesiastical officers as remuneration for the performance of their duties, including any duties imposed by Measures.}}
|-
| {{|Clergy (National Emergency Precautions) Measure 1939|church|3|28-07-1939|archived=n|A Measure passed by the National Assembly of the Church of England to enable the Archbishops of Canterbury and York to make regulations for the more effective exercise of the cure of souls in the event of war, and to enable the Ecclesiastical Commissioners and Queen Anne's Bounty to make financial provision in respect thereof.}}
|-
| {{|House of Laity (Postponement of Election) Measure 1939|church|1|14-12-1939|archived=n|A Measure passed by the National Assembly of the Church of England to postpone the election of members of the House of Laity due to be held in the year 1940.}}
|-
| {{|Benefice Buildings (Postponement of Inspections and Repayment of Loans) Measure 1940|church|2|17-07-1940|archived=n|A Measure passed by the National Assembly of the Church of England to enable Diocesan Dilapidations Boards to postpone quinquennial inspections of benefice buildings and repayment of loans during a period of emergency and for purposes connected therewith.}}
|-
| {{|Ecclesiastical Dilapidations (Chancel Repairs) Measure 1940|church|3|17-07-1940|archived=n|A Measure passed by the National Assembly of the Church of England to enable Diocesan Authorities at the request of Parochial Church Councils and with the consent of Queen Anne's Bounty to apply capital moneys in certain cases to the immediate repairs of chancels.}}
|-
| {{|Diocesan Reorganisation Committees Measure 1941|church|1|29-07-1941|archived=n|A Measure passed by the National Assembly of the Church of England to provide for the appointment of Diocesan Reorganisation Committees and to define their powers and duties; to provide for deferring the restoration of damaged churches and parsonage houses, and for suspending the exercise of rights of presentation in certain cases; and to enable the Diocesan Boards of Finance to receive payments under the War Damage Act, 1941.}}
|-
| {{|Ecclesiastical Commissioners (Powers) Measure 1942|church|1|29-04-1942|archived=n|A Measure passed by the National Assembly of the Church of England to empower the Ecclesiastical Commissioners to pay certain grants on the sole authority of a resolution of the Commissioners.}}
|-
| {{|Loans (Postponement of Repayment) Measure 1942|church|2|06-08-1942|archived=n|A Measure passed by the National Assembly of the Church of England to give Queen Anne's Bounty power during a period of emergency to postpone the repayment of principal moneys of loans made by them under certain Acts and Measures and for purposes connected therewith.}}
|-
| {{|New Parishes Measure 1943|church|1|04-02-1943|maintained=y|archived=n|A Measure passed by the National Assembly of the Church of England to consolidate with amendments the New Parishes Acts, 1843 to 1884, to repeal such of the provisions of the Church Building Acts, 1818 to 1884, as authorise the formation of new ecclesiastical districts or as are obsolete, and to re-enact with amendments other provisions of the last mentioned Acts, and for purposes connected with the matters aforesaid.}}
|-
| {{|Episcopal Endowments and Stipends Measure 1943|church|2|04-02-1943|maintained=y|archived=n|A Measure passed by the National Assembly of the Church of England to make provision for empowering the Ecclesiastical Commissioners to take over the endowments and property of any see, to pay to the bishop of the diocese an appropriate stipend, to provide for him a suitable residence, to accept responsibility in respect of certain stipends and other official expenses and to deal with any existing house of residence belonging to the see.}}
|-
| {{|Diocesan Education Committees Measure 1943|church|3|11-11-1943|archived=n|A Measure passed by the National Assembly of the Church of England to provide for the appointment of diocesan education committees and to define their powers and duties; to provide for the consultation and co-operation of such committees with the trustees or owners and managers of church schools in regard to such schools; to make provision for the application of moneys received for war damage to church schools; and for purposes connected therewith.}}
|-
| {{|Reorganisation Areas Measure 1944|church|1|21-03-1944|archived=n|A Measure passed by the National Assembly of the Church of England to authorise the making of new arrangements for the pastoral supervision of areas which have suffered war damage, or in which, by reason of causes attributable to the war or as a result of planning schemes, material changes in the number or situation of the population have occurred, or are likely to occur, and to amend in certain respects the Diocesan Reorganisation Committees Measure, 1941.}}
|-
| {{|Emergency Legislation Measure 1944|church|1|21-12-1944|archived=n|A Measure passed by the National Assembly of the Church of England to make further provision with respect to the present national emergency.}}
|-
| {{|Episcopal Pensions Measure 1945|church|2|15-06-1945|archived=n|A Measure passed by the National Assembly of the Church of England to establish a pension scheme for suffragan bishops; to provide for increased pension contributions by diocesan bishops; to enable provision to be made for the widows of bishops; and to amend in certain respects the existing Measures relating to clergy and episcopal pensions.}}
|-
| {{|Incumbents (Disability) Measure 1945|church|3|15-06-1945|archived=n|A Measure passed by the National Assembly of the Church of England to make provision for the cure of souls when through disability arising from age or infirmity (whether bodily or mental) an incumbent of a benefice is unable to discharge adequately the duties attaching thereto and to make provision for payment for the discharge of such duties and for the pension of such incumbent.}}
|-
| {{|Ecclesiastical Commissioners (Curate Grants) Measure 1946|church|1|22-05-1946|maintained=y|archived=n|A Measure passed by the National Assembly of the Church of England to make provision for the transfer to diocesan boards of finance of the administration of sums from the common fund of the Ecclesiastical Commissioners allocated for payments towards the stipends of curates assistant clergy deaconesses and lay helpers, and in connexion therewith to authorise the termination of existing grants payable for the purposes aforesaid.}}
|-
| {{|Clergy Pensions (Supplementary Pensions) Measure 1946|church|2|22-05-1946|archived=n|A Measure passed by the National Assembly of the Church of England to provide for the payment of supplementary pensions to certain persons in receipt of pensions under the Clergy Pensions Measures, 1926 to 1936, and the Clergy Pensions (Older Incumbents) Measure, 1930.}}
|-
| {{|Benefices (Suspension of Presentation) Measure 1946|church|3|22-05-1946|archived=n|A Measure passed by the National Assembly of the Church of England to enable the filling of vacancies in benefices to be postponed for certain periods and to make provision for the performance of the ecclesiastical duties, the use of the houses of residence, the management of the property, and the application of the income of the benefices during those periods.}}
|-
| {{|Incumbents (Discipline) Measure 1947|church|1|18-02-1947|archived=n|A Measure passed by the National Assembly of the Church of England to amend the law for the enforcement of Church discipline in the case of incumbents.}}
|-
| {{|Church Commissioners Measure 1947|church|2|02-04-1947|maintained=y|archived=n|A Measure passed by the National Assembly of the Church of England to promote the more efficient and economical administration of the resources of the Church of England by uniting the Corporation of the Governors of the Bounty of Queen Anne for the augmentation of the maintenance of the poor clergy, founded by charter under the Great Seal in the year 1704, and the Ecclesiastical Commissioners for England originally established in the year 1836 by the statute 6 and 7 William the Fourth, chapter 77.}}
|-
| {{|Parsonages (Amendment) Measure 1947|church|3|31-07-1947|maintained=y|archived=n|A Measure passed by the National Assembly of the Church of England to amend the Parsonages Measure, 1938, and for purposes connected therewith.}}
|-
| {{|Clergy Pensions Measure 1948|church|1|24-03-1948|archived=n|A Measure passed by the National Assembly of the Church of England to consolidate with amendments, the Clergy Pensions Measures, 1926 to 1946, to limit the application of those Measures to clergy already ordained, to establish a new scheme of pensions for clergy hereafter ordained and their widows and children and to amend the Clergy Pensions (Older Incumbents) Measure, 1930 and for purposes connected therewith.}}
|-
| {{|Church Dignitaries (Retirement) Measure 1949|church|1|14-07-1949|maintained=y|archived=n|A Measure passed by the National Assembly of the Church of England to make provision for the retirement of deans, provosts, archdeacons, canons, prebendaries and other church dignitaries if incapacitated by age or physical or mental infirmity, or if guilty of unbecoming conduct or neglect of duty, and for purposes connected with the matters aforesaid.}}
|-
| {{|Parochial Church Councils (Powers) (Amendment) Measure 1949|church|2|14-07-1949|archived=n|A Measure passed by the National Assembly of the Church of England to make further provision with respect to the powers of Parochial Church Councils under the Parochial Church Councils (Powers) Measure, 1921, and to provide for related matters.}}
|-
| {{|Pastoral Reorganisation Measure 1949|church|3|14-07-1949|archived=n|A Measure passed by the National Assembly of the Church of England to make better provision for the cure of souls by simplifying the procedure for the union of benefices and the holding of benefices in plurality, to restrict temporarily the exercise of rights of patronage in certain cases, to provide for the partial diversion of the endowment income of certain benefices, to amend the Pluralities Act, 1838, and the Reorganisation Areas Measure, 1944, and for purposes connected therewith.}}
|-
| {{|Benefices (Suspension of Presentation) Measure 1946 (Amendment) Measure 1949|church|4|16-12-1949|archived=n|A Measure passed by the National Assembly of the Church of England to amend the Benefices (Suspension of Presentation) Measure, 1946.}}
|-
| {{|Reorganisation Areas Measure 1944 (Amendment) Measure 1949|church|5|16-12-1949|archived=n|A Measure passed by the National Assembly of the Church of England to amend the Reorganisation Areas Measure, 1944.}}
|-
| {{|Incumbents (Discipline) Measure 1947 (Amendment) Measure 1950|church|1|28-07-1950|archived=n|A Measure passed by the National Assembly of the Church of England to amend the Incumbents (Discipline) Measure, 1947.}}
|-
| {{|Diocesan Education Committees Measure 1943 (Amendment) Measure 1951|church|1|21-03-1951|archived=n|A Measure passed by the National Assembly of the Church of England to amend the Diocesan Education Committees Measure, 1943.}}
|-
| {{|Bishops (Retirement) Measure 1951|church|2|26-04-1951|archived=n|A Measure passed by the National Assembly of the Church of England to make provision for the voluntary or compulsory retirement of bishops if incapacitated by physical or mental disability, for voluntary retirement if a change of administration is desirable, and for temporary suspension, censure, or compulsory retirement in case of unbecoming conduct or neglect of duty, and for purposes connected with the matters aforesaid.}}
|-
| {{|Ecclesiastical Dilapidations Measures 1923 to 1929 (Amendment) Measure 1951|church|3|22-06-1951|archived=n|A Measure passed by the National Assembly of the Church of England to amend the Ecclesiastical Dilapidations Measures, 1923 to 1929, by enabling Diocesan Dilapidations Boards to postpone inspections of benefice buildings and to simplify the procedure for authorising payments in respect of repairs in certain cases.}}
|-
| {{|Cathedrals (Appointed Commissions) Measure 1951|church|4|22-06-1951|archived=n|A Measure passed by the National Assembly of the Church of England to empower the Church Commissioners to make payments towards the expenses of commissions appointed pursuant to section 17 of the Cathedrals Measure, 1931.}}
|-
| {{|Benefices (Stabilization of Incomes) Measure 1951|church|5|22-06-1951|archived=n|A Measure passed by the National Assembly of the Church of England to stabilize income derived by benefices from certain endowments by providing for the transfer of such endowments to the general fund of the Church Commissioners, appropriating sums of money in lieu of the endowments so transferred and charging the general fund of the Commissioners in favour of the benefices concerned; and to amend the Glebe Lands Act, 1888.}}
|-
| {{|Church of England Pensions Board (Powers) Measure 1952|church|1|30-04-1952|archived=n|A Measure passed by The National Assembly of the Church of England to make further provision with respect to the powers of the Church of England Pensions Board and to confer on the Board the status of a housing association and of a trust corporation.}}
|-
| {{|Union of Benefices (Disused Churches) Measure 1952|church|1|16-12-1952|archived=n|A Measure passed by The National Assembly of the Church of England to amend the Union of Benefices Measure, 1923, and for purposes connected therewith.}}
|-
| {{|Diocesan Stipends Funds Measure 1953|church|2|26-03-1953|maintained=y|archived=n|A Measure passed by the National Assembly of the Church of England to make further provision in relation to diocesan stipends funds established by the Reorganisation Areas Measure, 1944, and the Pastoral Reorganisation Measure, 1949, and for that purpose to amend those Measures and for purposes connected therewith.}}
|-
| {{|Incumbents (Discipline) and Church Dignitaries (Retirement) Amendment Measure 1953|church|3|06-05-1953|archived=n|A Measure passed by the National Assembly of the Church of England to amend the Incumbents (Discipline) Measure, 1947, and the Church Dignitaries (Retirement) Measure, 1949, in relation to proceedings under those Measures in respect of social or political activities.}}
|-
| {{|Archdeaconries (Augmentation) Measure 1953|church|4|14-07-1953|archived=n|A Measure passed by the National Assembly of the Church of England to enable the Church Commissioners to augment archdeaconries by annual sums payable out of their general fund and to repeal the provisions under which archdeaconries may be endowed out of canonries or benefices.}}
|-
| {{|Benefices (Suspension of Presentation) Measure 1953|church|5|29-10-1953|archived=n|A Measure passed by the National Assembly of the Church of England to extend the duration of the provisions of the Benefices (Suspension of Presentation) Measures, 1946 and 1949, and to consolidate those Measures with amendments and for purposes connected therewith.}}
|-
| {{|New Housing Areas (Church Buildings) Measure 1954|church|1|18-03-1954|maintained=y|archived=n|A Measure passed by the National Assembly of the Church of England to enable the Church Commissioners to make grants or loans in respect of church buildings in certain areas, having regard to recent housing development in those areas and the absence or insufficiency of suitable church buildings therein.}}
|-
| {{|Reorganisation Areas Measure 1944 (Amendment) Measure 1954|church|2|18-03-1954|archived=n|A Measure passed by the National Assembly of the Church of England to amend the provisions of the Reorganisation Areas Measures, 1944 and 1949, by extending the period of restriction of the exercise of patronage and the period within which proposals for reorganisation schemes may be received.}}
|-
| {{|Cathedrals (Grants) Measure 1954|church|3|18-03-1954|archived=n|A Measure passed by the National Assembly of the Church of England to enable grants to be made directly to deans, provosts and canons residentiary under section twenty of the Cathedrals Measure, 1931.}}
|-
| {{|Clergy Pensions Measure 1954|church|4|30-07-1954|archived=n|A Measure passed by the National Assembly of the Church of England to provide for making the general fund of the Church Commissioners the source of pensions to Clergy and thereby increasing such pensions, and making them no longer contributory where they have been so, and for purposes connected with the matters aforesaid.}}
|-
| {{|Inspection of Churches Measure 1955|church|1|29-03-1955|maintained=y|archived=n|A Measure passed by the National Assembly of the Church of England to provide for the establishment of schemes for the inspection of churches by architects at least once in every five years; and for purposes connected therewith.}}
|-
| {{|Diocesan Education Committees Measure 1955|church|1|21-12-1955|maintained=y|archived=n|A Measure passed by the National Assembly of the Church of England to consolidate with amendments certain provisions of the Diocesan Education Committees Measure, 1943, and the Diocesan Education Committees Measure, 1943 (Amendment) Measure, 1951; to provide for the validation and continuance of orders made under the provisions of those Measures and for purposes connected therewith.}}
|-
| {{|Representation of the Laity Measure 1956|church|2|05-07-1956|archived=n|A Measure passed by the National Assembly of the Church of England to amend the Rules for the Representation of the Laity, and in particular, to enlarge the subject matter of the Rules in certain respects.}}
|-
| {{|Parochial Church Councils (Powers) Measure 1956|church|3|05-07-1956|maintained=y|archived=n|A Measure passed by the National Assembly of the Church of England to consolidate with amendments certain enactments relating to parochial church councils and parochial charities.}}
|-
| {{|Channel Islands (Church Legislation) Measure 1931 (Amendment) Measure 1957|church|1|17-07-1957|maintained=y|archived=n|A Measure passed by the National Assembly of the Church of England to amend the Channel Islands (Church Legislation) Measure, 1931.}}
|-
| {{|Church Funds Investment Measure 1958|church|1|20-02-1958|maintained=y|archived=n|A Measure passed by the National Assembly of the Church of England to make better provision for the investment of certain funds of or connected with the Church of England.}}
|-
| {{|Church Schools (Assistance by Church Commissioners) Measure 1958|church|2|20-02-1958|maintained=y|archived=n|A Measure passed by the National Assembly of the Church of England to enable the Church Commissioners to make payments for the provision of financial assistance for certain church schools; and for purposes connected therewith.}}
|-
| {{|Truro Cathedral Measure 1959|church|1|25-03-1959|archived=n|A Measure passed by the National Assembly of the Church of England to make further provision for the government of the Cathedral Church of Truro, to repeal the Truro Chapter Act, 1878, and to repeal the Truro Bishopric and Chapter Acts Amendment Act, 1887, and to re-enact with amendments certain of its provisions.}}
|-
| {{|Vacancies in Sees Measure 1959|church|2|25-03-1959|maintained=y|archived=n|A Measure passed by the National Assembly of the Church of England to enable the guardian of the spiritualities of a see to act during a vacancy thereof in place of the bishop for the purposes of certain enactments and for purposes connected therewith.}}
|-
| {{|Guildford Cathedral Measure 1959|church|3|25-03-1959|archived=n|A Measure passed by the National Assembly of the Church of England to transfer the dignity and status of the Cathedral of the Diocese of Guildford from the Church of the Holy Trinity in Guildford to the Church of the Holy Spirit in Guildford, to constitute a Dean and Chapter of the Cathedral Church, to make provision for the government of the Cathedral Church and for purposes connected therewith.}}
|-
| {{|Church Property (Miscellaneous Provisions) Measure 1960|church|1|13-04-1960|maintained=y|archived=n|A Measure passed by the National Assembly of the Church of England to amend the Parsonages Measure, 1938, and the New Parishes Measure, 1943, and to make further provision as to church land; to make further provision as to grants and payments by the Church Commissioners; to provide for the distribution of the tithe maintenance fund; to alter the title of the Church Estates Commissioner appointed by the Archbishop of Canterbury, to transfer to the Church Commissioners the property and certain functions of the Church Estates Commissioners and to make provision as to the pensions of the Church Estates Commissioners; to enable certain suffragan bishops to receive augmentation from the Clergy Pensions Institution; to provide for the transfer of rights of patronage within twelve months from the last institution or admission to the benefice; to abolish certain restrictions in respect of assurances of property to diocesan authorities; to dispense with the publication in the London Gazette of Orders in Council confirming schemes of the Church Commissioners; and for purposes connected with the matters aforesaid.}}
|-
| {{|Farnham Castle Measure 1961|church|1|02-03-1961|archived=n|A Measure passed by the National Assembly of the Church of England to vest part of Farnham Castle in the Church Commissioners and to make provision for their powers in relation to the whole of Farnham Castle.}}
|-
| {{|Baptismal Registers Measure 1961|church|2|03-08-1961|maintained=y|archived=n|A Measure passed by the National Assembly of the Church of England to provide for the annotation of parochial registers of baptisms in cases of persons legitimated after baptism, and for the issue of short certificates of baptism in certain cases, and for purposes connected with the matters aforesaid.}}
|-
| {{|Clergy Pensions Measure 1961|church|3|03-08-1961|maintained=y|archived=n|A Measure passed by the National Assembly of the Church of England to consolidate with amendments the Acts of Parliament and Measures of the Church Assembly relating to pensions for clergy and their widows and dependants and to the powers of the Church of England Pensions Board; to provide for increases in the pensions payable to clergy and for making the pensions payable to bishops no longer contributory; to provide for pensions which are not contributory for certain widows of clergy; to confer on the Church of England Pensions Board power to provide homes of residence for retired church workers and their wives and for the widows and dependants of deceased church workers; and for purposes connected with the matters aforesaid.}}
|-
| {{|Ecclesiastical Fees Measure 1962|church|1|03-07-1962|archived=n|A Measure passed by the National Assembly of the Church of England to make further provision for the establishment of tables of ecclesiastical fees, to relieve certain clerks in Holy Orders from the liability to pay certain fees and for purposes connected therewith.}}
|-
| {{|Ecclesiastical Jurisdiction Measure 1963|church|1|31-07-1963|maintained=y|archived=n|A Measure passed by The National Assembly of the Church of England to reform and reconstruct the system of ecclesiastical courts of the Church of England, to replace with new provisions the existing enactments relating to ecclesiastical discipline, to abolish certain obsolete jurisdictions and fees, and for purposes connected therewith.}}
|-
| {{|Cathedrals Measure 1963|church|2|31-07-1963|maintained=y|archived=n|A Measure passed by the National Assembly of the Church of England to replace with new provisions the Cathedral Measures 1931 and 1934, and other enactments relating to cathedral churches; to repeal certain obsolete provisions relating to cathedral churches or to churches which are or have been collegiate churches; and for purposes connected therewith.}}
|-
| {{|Church Commissioners (Loans for Theological Colleges and Training Houses) Measure 1964|church|1|27-02-1964|maintained=y|archived=n|A Measure passed by the National Assembly of the Church of England to enable the Church Commissioners to make or guarantee loans to defray capital expenditure in connection with establishments for the training of men for the Ministry and of women for work in connection with the cure of souls.}}
|-
| {{|Incumbents and Churchwardens (Trusts) Measure 1964|church|2|27-02-1964|maintained=y|archived=n|A Measure passed by the National Assembly of the Church of England to vest certain real and personal property held, acquired or administered upon charitable ecclesiastical trusts by incumbents and churchwardens jointly or severally and certain ecclesiastical corporations, in the diocesan authority and for purposes connected therewith.}}
|-
| {{|Churchwardens (Appointment and Resignation) Measure 1964|church|3|27-02-1964|maintained=y|archived=n|A Measure passed by the National Assembly of the Church of England to regulate the number and qualifications of, and the time and manner of choosing, churchwardens of parishes; to regulate their admission to office; to provide for the resignation of churchwardens and for their vacating their offices in certain events; to regulate the qualifications of churchwardens of Guild Churches in the City of London; and for purposes connected therewith.}}
|-
| {{|Holy Table Measure 1964|church|4|15-04-1964|archived=n|A Measure passed by the National Assembly of the Church of England to enable the Holy Table in a Church or Chapel to be immovable and to be made of any suitable material.}}
|-
| {{|Faculty Jurisdiction Measure 1964|church|5|15-04-1964|maintained=y|archived=n|A Measure passed by the National Assembly of the Church of England to enable ecclesiastical courts to vest privately owned parts of churches in the persons in whom the churches are vested; to amend the law relating to the issue of faculties out of such courts concerning the demolition of churches and works affecting monuments in private ownership; to empower bishops to make certain licensed chapels subject to the faculty jurisdiction of such courts; to declare the law relating to the jurisdiction of such courts over the curtilage of churches; to limit the duration of rights of sepulture; to make better provision for the enforcement of orders as to costs and expenses; to repeal and re-enact the Faculty Jurisdiction Measure 1938, with amendments; and for other purposes connected therewith.}}
|-
| {{|Clergy (Ordination and Miscellaneous Provisions) Measure 1964|church|6|10-06-1964|maintained=y|archived=n|A Measure passed by the National Assembly of the Church of England to amend the law relating to the qualifications for Holy Orders and to the Form and Manner of Making, Ordaining and Consecrating Bishops, Priests and Deacons; and to amend the law relating to the revocation of licences granted to Ministers and to the occupations of Ministers.}}
|-
| {{|Vestures of Ministers Measure 1964|church|7|31-07-1964|archived=n|A Measure passed by the National Assembly of the Church of England to regulate the vestures to be worn by Ministers at the times of their ministrations.}}
|-
| {{|Church Commissioners Measure 1964|church|8|31-07-1964|maintained=y|archived=n|A Measure passed by the National Assembly of the Church of England to amend the Church Commissioners Measure 1947 and certain other provisions relating to the Estates and Finance Committee and the Church Estates Commissioners.}}
|-
| {{|Prayer Book (Alternative and Other Services) Measure 1965|church|1|23-03-1965|archived=n|A Measure passed by the National Assembly of the Church of England to authorise the use by way of experiment of alternative forms of Service deviating from the Book of Common Prayer and the use of forms of Service for use on special occasions; and to authorise minor variations in public prayer and for purposes connected therewith.}}
|-
| {{|Benefices (Suspension of Presentation) (Continuance) Measure 1965|church|2|02-06-1965|archived=n|A Measure passed by the National Assembly of the Church of England to extend the duration of section 1 of the Benefices (Suspension of Presentation) Measure 1953.}}
|-
| {{|Prayer Book (Miscellaneous Provisions) Measure 1965|church|3|05-08-1965|archived=n|A Measure passed by the National Assembly of the Church of England to authorise the approval of days of Special Observance; to enable a Bishop to authorise a Minister to dispense with the reading of Morning and Evening Prayer on certain days; to amend the rubrics at the beginning and end of the Communion Service in the Book of Common Prayer; and to extend the right to use the Book of Common Prayer in Latin to all universities and certain other places of learning.}}
|-
| {{|Prayer Book (Versions of the Bible) Measure 1965|church|4|22-12-1965|maintained=y|archived=n|A Measure passed by the National Assembly of the Church of England to permit the use of any version of the Bible authorised by the Convocations with the concurrence of the House of Laity for portions of Scripture appointed to be read, said or sung in the Book of Common Prayer, and for purposes connected therewith.}}
|-
| {{|Clergy Pensions (Amendment) Measure 1967|church|1|22-03-1967|maintained=y|archived=n|A Measure passed by the National Assembly of the Church of England to amend the Clergy Pensions Measure 1961.}}
|-
| {{|Extra-Parochial Ministry Measure 1967|church|2|14-07-1967|maintained=y|archived=n|A Measure passed by the National Assembly of the Church of England to authorise the Minister of a parish to exercise his ministry outside the parish for the benefit of persons on the electoral roll of the parish: and for licensing a Minister to exercise his ministry at or for the benefit of an institution without the consent of and without being subject to the control of the Minister of the parish.}}
|-
| {{|Overseas and Other Clergy (Ministry and Ordination) Measure 1967|church|3|14-07-1967|maintained=y|archived=n|A Measure passed by the National Assembly of the Church of England to make better provision for permitting overseas clergymen and certain other clergymen to exercise their ministry in the provinces of Canterbury and York, for enabling overseas bishops and certain other bishops to exercise episcopal functions in the said provinces, for the ordination of clergymen for ministry overseas, and for matters connected with the matters aforesaid.}}
|-
| {{|Pastoral Measure 1968|church|1|30-05-1968|archived=n|A Measure passed by The National Assembly of the Church of England to make better provision for the cure of souls and for the use, preservation or disposal of redundant churches, to amend the law relating to pluralities, to enable certain pastoral functions of bishops relating to property to be delegated, and for purposes connected with the matters aforesaid.}}
|-
| {{|Prayer Book (Further Provisions) Measure 1968|church|2|18-12-1968|maintained=y|archived=n|A Measure passed by the National Assembly of the Church of England to make further provision for amending the Book of Common Prayer and certain enactments relating to that Book and to the burial service.}}
|-
| {{|Clergy Pensions (Amendment) Measure 1969|church|1|25-07-1969|archived=n|A Measure passed by the National Assembly of the Church of England to amend the Clergy Pensions Measure 1961 in respect of the entitlement to pension and rate of pension of clerks in Holy Orders who retire before the retiring age.}}
|-
| {{|Synodical Government Measure 1969|church|2|25-07-1969|maintained=y|archived=n|A Measure passed by The National Assembly of the Church of England to provide for the vesting by Canon of the functions, authority, rights and privileges of the Convocations of Canterbury and York in the General Synod of the Church of England, and for the modification by Canon of the functions of the said Convocations when sitting separately for their provinces; to rename and reconstitute the Church Assembly as the General Synod, and to make further provision for the synodical government of the Church of England, and for purposes connected with the matters aforesaid.}}
|-
| {{|Collegiate Churches (Capital Endowments) Measure 1970|church|1|24-03-1970|archived=n|A Measure passed by the National Assembly of the Church of England to provide capital endowments for the Collegiate Churches of St. Peter in Westminster and St. George, Windsor.}}
|-
| {{|Sharing of Church Buildings Measure 1970|church|2|24-03-1970|maintained=y|archived=n|A Measure passed by The National Assembly of the Church of England to extend the Pastoral Measure 1968 for the purpose of authorising sharing agreements in respect of consecrated churches and parsonage houses, and to provide for other matters arising out of the sharing of church buildings by the Church of England.}}
|-
| {{|Church Commissioners Measure 1970|church|3|17-12-1970|maintained=y|archived=n|A Measure passed by the National Assembly of the Church of England to provide for the appointment of Church Commissioners as additional members of the General Purposes Committee and the Assets Committee of the Church Commissioners.}}
|-
| {{|Synodical Government (Special Majorities) Measure 1971|church|1|17-02-1971|maintained=y|archived=n|A Measure passed by the National Assembly of the Church of England to authorise the General Synod of the Church of England to require special majorities for a scheme for a constitutional union or a permanent and substantial change of relationship between the Church of England and another Christian body, and for the exercise of powers to suspend the Standing Orders of the General Synod.}}
|-
| {{|Admission to Holy Communion Measure 1972|church|1|10-02-1972|maintained=y|archived=n|A Measure passed by the General Synod of the Church of England to provide for admission to the Holy Communion.}}
|-
| {{|Repair of Benefice Buildings Measure 1972|church|2|10-02-1972|maintained=y|archived=n|A Measure passed by the General Synod of the Church of England to provide for the repair of parsonage houses by Parsonages Boards and for the repair of other buildings belonging to a benefice; to make other provision for repairs and other works and matters relating to church buildings and land; and for purposes connected therewith.}}
|-
| {{|Benefices Measure 1972|church|3|10-02-1972|maintained=y|archived=n|A Measure passed by the General Synod of the Church of England to provide an additional ground for refusing to institute or admit a presentee to a benefice, and for purposes connected therewith.}}
|-
| {{|Deaconesses and Lay Ministry Measure 1972|church|4|09-08-1972|maintained=y|archived=n|A Measure passed by the General Synod of the Church of England to enable further provision to be made by Canon with respect to the ministry of deaconesses, licensed lay workers, readers and other lay persons.}}
|-
| {{|Clergy Pensions (Amendment) Measure 1972|church|5|09-08-1972|maintained=y|archived=n|A Measure passed by the General Synod of the Church of England to Amend the Clergy Pensions Measures 1961 to 1969.}}
|-
| {{|Synodical Government (Amendment) Measure 1974|church|1|09-07-1974|maintained=y|archived=n|A Measure passed by the General Synod of the Church of England to make provision for the amendment of the Constitutions of the Convocations of Canterbury and York; to amend Article 8 of the Constitution of the General Synod of the Church of England; and to make further provision with respect to the manner of voting in the General Synod.}}
|-
| {{|Ecclesiastical Jurisdiction (Amendment) Measure 1974|church|2|09-07-1974|maintained=y|archived=n|A Measure passed by The General Synod of the Church of England to amend the Ecclesiastical Jurisdiction Measure 1963.}}
|-
| {{|Church of England (Worship and Doctrine) Measure 1974|church|3|12-12-1974|maintained=y|archived=n|A Measure passed by the General Synod of the Church of England to enable provision to be made by Canon with respect to worship in the Church of England and other matters prescribed by the Book of Common Prayer, and with respect to the obligations and forms of assent or subscription to the doctrine of the Church of England; to repeal enactments relating to the matters aforesaid; and for purposes connected therewith.}}
|-
| {{|Church Commissioners (Miscellaneous Provisions) Measure 1975|church|1|01-08-1975|maintained=y|archived=n|A Measure passed by the General Synod of the Church of England to make provision for empowering the Church Commissioners to make payments towards the stipend and expenses of the Bishop of Sodor and Man and to make further provision with respect to the pensions of Church Estates Commissioners and their widows.}}
|-
| {{|Ecclesiastical Offices (Age Limit) Measure 1975|church|2|01-08-1975|maintained=y|archived=n|A Measure passed by the General Synod of the Church of England to make provision with respect to the age limit for the holding of certain ecclesiastical offices.}}
|-
| {{|Cathedrals Measure 1976|church|1|25-03-1976|maintained=y|archived=n|A Measure passed by the General Synod of the Church of England to make fresh provision with respect to the revision of the constitution and statutes of cathedral churches; and to amend section 42 of the Cathedrals Measure 1963.}}
|-
| {{|Ecclesiastical Judges and Legal Officers Measure 1976|church|2|25-03-1976|maintained=y|archived=n|A Measure passed by the General Synod of the Church of England to regulate the age of retirement from the office of judge of an ecclesiastical court; to make provision for limiting the number of chancellorships to be held by one person; to make fresh provision with respect to the other legal officers of the Church of England; and for purposes connected with the matters aforesaid.}}
|-
| {{|Church of England (Miscellaneous Provisions) Measure 1976|church|3|15-11-1976|maintained=y|archived=n|A Measure passed by the General Synod of the Church of England to enable provision to be made by Canon with respect to certain declarations made and subscribed and other matters required on ordination and admission to office in the Church of England and to repeal the enactments relating to those matters; to enable provision to be made by Canon with respect to licensing of assistant curates for fixed terms; to replace section 85 of the Pastoral Measure 1968; to dispense with periodical episcopal visitations of cathedrals; to amend section 1 of the Benefices (Sequestrations) Measure 1933; to amend the law relating to the burial of certain persons in parish burial grounds; to repeal section 13 of the Burnley Rectory Act 1890; and for purposes connected with the matters aforesaid.}}
|-
| {{|Endowments and Glebe Measure 1976|church|4|22-11-1976|maintained=y|archived=n|A Measure passed by the General Synod of the Church of England to make fresh provision with respect to the means by which the clergy and certain lay persons engaged in the cure of souls are remunerated; to transfer glebe land to Diocesan Boards of Finance; to make provision with respect to the powers and duties of such Boards in relation to such land; to restrict the letting of parts of parsonage houses and to make other provision with respect to such houses; to amend the Diocesan Stipends Funds Measure 1953; to amend the law relating to sequestrations; to amend the law relating to the liability to repair certain chancels; and for purposes connected with the matters aforesaid.}}
|-
| {{|Incumbents (Vacation of Benefices) Measure 1977|church|1|30-06-1977|maintained=y|archived=n|A Measure passed by the General Synod of the Church of England to make provision, including provision for the vacation of the benefice, where there has been a serious breakdown of the pastoral relationship between an incumbent and his parishioners or where an incumbent is unable by reason of age or infirmity to discharge adequately the duties attaching to his benefice, and for purposes connected therewith.}}
|-
| {{|Dioceses Measure 1978|church|1|02-02-1978|maintained=y|archived=n|A Measure passed by the General Synod of the Church of England to make provision for enabling alterations to be made in the diocesan structure of the provinces of Canterbury and York; to make further provision for enabling certain functions of diocesan bishops to be discharged by suffragan bishops; to abolish the power to commission suffragan bishops; to make provision for constituting separate synods for areas of a diocese; to make further provision with respect to the nomination of suffragan bishops; to make provision with respect to the discharge of the functions of certain diocesan bodies; and for purposes connected with those matters.}}
|-
| {{|Parochial Registers and Records Measure 1978|church|2|02-02-1978|maintained=y|archived=n|A Measure passed by the General Synod of the Church of England to consolidate with amendments certain enactments relating to the registration of baptisms and burials and to repeal some of those enactments without re-enactment; to make fresh provision in place of the Parochial Registers and Records Measure 1929 with respect to diocesan record offices, the deposit therein of certain parochial registers and other records in ecclesiastical custody and the care of such registers and records; and for purposes connected therewith.}}
|-
| {{|Church of England (Miscellaneous Provisions) Measure 1978|church|3|30-06-1978|maintained=y|archived=n|A Measure passed by the General Synod of the Church of England to make further provision with respect to the special majorities required for the final approval of certain Measures; to make further provision with respect to the continuance in certain offices of persons in office at the commencement of the Ecclesiastical Offices (Age Limit) Measure 1975; to make provision for altering the financial year of the Church Commissioners; to amend Schedule 1 to the Church Commissioners Measure 1947; to provide for an additional member of diocesan boards of finance; to amend section 20 of the Parochial Registers and Records Measure 1978; to extend section 17 of the New Parishes Measure 1943; to make provision for facilitating the conveyance of ecclesiastical property in certain circumstances; to make provision for extending the Inspection of Churches Measure 1955 and schemes made thereunder; to amend section 43 of the Cathedrals Measure 1963 and sections 3 and 43 of the Endowments and Glebe Measure 1976; to repeal so much of section 21 of the Queen Anne's Bounty Act 1714 as requires certain documents to be enrolled in the High Court.}}
|-
| {{|Deaconesses and Lay Workers (Pensions) Measure 1980|church|1|20-03-1980|maintained=y|archived=n|A Measure passed by the General Synod of the Church of England to empower the Church Commissioners to make payments for the provision or augmentation of pensions and related benefits for deaconesses, lay workers, their dependants and widows; and for purposes connected therewith.}}
|-
| {{|Diocese in Europe Measure 1980|church|2|30-06-1980|maintained=y|archived=n|A Measure passed by the General Synod of the Church of England to make provision for the representation in the General Synod of the Church of England of the diocese of Gibraltar in Europe when established; to amend Article 8 of the Constitution of the General Synod in relation to the said diocese; to empower the Church Commissioners to pay to the bishop and any suffragan bishop of the said diocese when established a stipend and his official expenses and to provide or assist with the provision of suitable residences for such bishops; to confer pension rights on bishops and other clergy who perform ecclesiastical service in the said diocese after its establishment; to extend the Deaconesses and Lay Workers (Pensions) Measure 1980 to the said diocese; and to amend the Overseas and Other Clergy (Ministry and Ordination) Measure 1967.}}
|-
| {{|Pastoral (Amendment) Measure 1982|church|1|23-07-1982|archived=n|A Measure passed by the General Synod of the Church of England to amend the Pastoral Measure 1968 and make provision for enabling that Measure to be extended to the Isle of Man, to make provision for enabling a new body to be established to replace the Advisory Body for Redundant Churches and the Redundant Churches Fund and to amend section 5(3) of the Parsonages Measure 1938.}}
|-
| {{|Clergy Pension (Amendment) Measure 1982|church|2|23-07-1982|maintained=y|archived=n|A Measure passed by the General Synod of the Church of England to amend sections 17 and 26 of the Clergy Pensions Measure 1961; to make further provision with respect to the membership of pensions schemes for church workers and with respect to the investment of moneys comprised in certain pension funds established by the Church of England Pensions Board; and for purposes connected with the matters aforesaid.}}
|-
| {{|Pastoral Measure 1983|church|1|09-05-1983|maintained=y|archived=n|A Measure passed by The General Synod of The Church of England to consolidate with minor amendments the Pastoral Measure 1968, the Pastoral (Amendment) Measure 1982 and related enactments, which are designed to make better provision for the cure of souls.}}
|-
| {{|Church of England (Miscellaneous Provisions) Measure 1983|church|2|09-05-1983|maintained=y|archived=n|A Measure passed by The General Synod of the Church of England to amend the New Parishes Measure 1943, the Parsonages Measure 1938, the Parochial Church Councils (Powers) Measure 1956, the Ecclesiastical Judges and Legal Officers Measure 1976, and the Bishops (Retirement) Measure 1951; to make further provision with respect to the discharge of the functions of a bishop or archdeacon and the constitution of an Appeal Tribunal for the compensation of clergy; and to make provision for transferring a house and muniment room in Lichfield from the Registrar of Lichfield to the Diocesan Board of Finance; and for purposes connected therewith.}}
|-
| {{|Bishops (Retirement) Measure 1986|church|1|18-03-1986|maintained=y|archived=n|A Measure passed by the General Synod of the Church of England to make fresh provision with respect to the resignation or retirement of archbishops and bishops and for purposes connected therewith.}}
|-
| {{|Ecclesiastical Fees Measure 1986|church|2|18-03-1986|maintained=y|archived=n|A Measure passed by the General Synod of the Church of England to make further provision with respect to ecclesiastical fees and for purposes connected therewith.}}
|-
| {{|Patronage (Benefices) Measure 1986|church|3|18-07-1986|maintained=y|archived=n|A Measure passed by the General Synod of the Church of England to amend the law relating to patronage of benefices.}}
|-
| {{|Deacons (Ordination of Women) Measure 1986|church|4|07-11-1986|maintained=y|archived=n|A Measure passed by the General Synod of the Church of England to make provision for the ordination of women as deacons, and for connected purposes.}}
|-
| {{|Church of England (Legal Aid and Miscellaneous Provisions) Measure 1988|church|1|09-02-1988|maintained=y|archived=n|A Measure passed by the General Synod of the Church of England to make further provision concerning legal aid; to enable marriages of housebound and detained persons to be solemnized by persons licensed under the Extra-Parochial Ministry Measure 1967; to make provision for the change of name of a see; to enable further provision to be made by Canon with respect to licences granted to ministers, deaconesses, lay workers and readers; to make provision with respect to the appointment of organists and choirmasters; to amend section 31 of the Leasehold Reform Act 1967, section 7 of the Parochial Church Councils (Powers) Measure 1956, section 7 of the Church Property (Miscellaneous Provisions) Measure 1960, and section 3 of the Pastoral Measure 1983; to amend provisions of the Clergy Pensions Measure 1961 relating to the Clergy (Widows and Dependants) Fund; and for connected purposes.}}
|-
| {{|Church Commissioners (Assistance for Priority Areas) Measure 1988|church|2|03-05-1988|maintained=y|archived=n|A Measure passed by The General Synod of the Church of England to extend the power of the Church Commissioners to make grants or loans in respect of church buildings in certain areas which are not sufficiently supplied with suitable church buildings and to enable the Church Commissioners to make grants or loans to the Church Urban Fund.}}
|-
| {{|Church of England (Ecumenical Relations) Measure 1988|church|3|29-07-1988|maintained=y|archived=n|A Measure passed by the General Synod of the Church of England to enable provision to be made by Canon with respect to local co-operation between the Church of England and other Churches; to modify in certain cases restrictions imposed by the Overseas and Other Clergy (Ministry and Ordination) Measure 1967; and for connected purposes.}}
|-
| {{|Church of England (Pensions) Measure 1988|church|4|27-10-1988|maintained=y|archived=n|A Measure passed by the General Synod of the Church of England to amend the Clergy Pensions Measures 1961 to 1982, and for connected purposes.}}
|-
| {{|Clergy (Ordination) Measure 1990|church|1|22-02-1990|maintained=y|archived=n|A Measure passed by the General Synod of the Church of England to amend the law relating to impediments to admission into Holy Orders.}}
|-
| {{|Care of Cathedrals Measure 1990|church|2|26-07-1990|maintained=y|archived=n|A Measure passed by the General Synod of the Church of England to make further provision for the care and conservation of cathedral churches.}}
|-
| {{|Care of Churches and Ecclesiastical Jurisdiction Measure 1991|church|1|25-07-1991|maintained=y|archived=n|A Measure passed by the General Synod of the Church of England to make provision as to the care of churches and the lands and articles appertaining thereto and of documents of historic interest to the Church of England; to amend the law relating to the inspection of churches; to amend the law relating to ecclesiastical courts, commissions, judges and registrars; to make further provision as to the grant of faculties; to enable bishops to remove the legal effects of consecration; to repeal section 4 of the Parish Notices Act 1837; and for purposes connected therewith.}}
|-
| {{|Diocesan Boards of Education Measure 1991|church|2|25-07-1991|note3=|maintained=y|archived=n|A Measure passed by the General Synod of the Church of England to make provision as to Diocesan Boards of Education.}}
|-
| {{|Church of England (Miscellaneous Provisions) Measure 1992|church|1|06-03-1992|maintained=y|archived=n|A Measure passed by the General Synod of the Church of England to amend the law relating to sequestration; to make further provision with respect to the appointment of new patrons; to make further provision with respect to the conduct of funeral services and rights of burial; to enable parochial church councils to hold advowsons; to amend the law relating to the resignation of incumbents; to amend the law relating to the tenure of office of diocesan chancellors and registrars; to clarify the law relating to archdeacons' visitations; to clarify the law relating to the appointment of rural deans; to amend the law relating to the appointment of canons in cathedral churches; to amend section 27 of the Cemeteries Clauses Act 1847, section 11 of the Benefices Act 1898, sections 13, 16 and 17 of the New Parishes Measure 1943, section 5 of and the First Schedule to the Church Commissioners Measure 1947, sections 4 and 5 of the Diocesan Stipends Funds Measure 1953, section 12 of the Cathedrals Measure 1963, sections 55 and 56 of the Ecclesiastical Jurisdiction Measure 1963, section 1 of the Benefices Measure 1972, sections 3, 4 and 5 of the Cathedrals Measure 1976, sections 20, 23, 24 and 38 of the Endowments and Glebe Measure 1976, the Parochial Registers and Records Measure 1978, section 2 of the Dioceses Measure 1978, sections 29, 54 and 68 of and Schedules 4, 6 and 7 to the Pastoral Measure 1983, section 9 of and Schedule 2 to the Patronage (Benefices) Measure 1986 and section 5 of the Church of England (Ecumenical Relations) Measure 1988; to repeal certain enactments which are no longer of practical utility; and for purposes connected therewith.}}
|-
| {{|Incumbents (Vacation of Benefices) (Amendment) Measure 1993|church|1|27-07-1993|maintained=y|archived=n|A Measure passed by the General Synod of the Church of England to amend the Incumbents (Vacation of Benefices) Measure 1977.}}
|-
| {{|Priests (Ordination of Women) Measure 1993|church|2|05-11-1993|maintained=y|archived=n|A Measure passed by the General Synod of the Church of England to make provision for the ordination of women as priests, and for connected purposes.}}
|-
| {{|Ordination of Women (Financial Provisions) Measure 1993|church|3|05-11-1993|maintained=y|archived=n|A Measure passed by the General Synod of the Church of England to make provision as to the relief of hardship incurred by persons resigning from ecclesiastical service by reason of opposition to the ordination of women as priests, and for connected purposes.}}
|-
| {{|Pastoral (Amendment) Measure 1994|church|1|24-03-1994|maintained=y|archived=n|A Measure passed by the General Synod of the Church of England to amend the Pastoral Measure 1983, in so far as it relates to redundant buildings and land annexed or belonging thereto, in connection with financial matters, with the removal of the legal effects of consecration, with the discharge and modification of covenants and with the annual report of the Advisory Board for Redundant Churches; and to provide a new name for the Redundant Churches Fund.}}
|-
| {{|Care of Cathedrals (Supplementary Provisions) Measure 1994|church|2|21-07-1994|maintained=y|archived=n|A Measure passed by the General Synod of the Church of England to make further provision in connection with the care and conservation of cathedral churches.}}
|-
| {{|Church of England (Legal Aid) Measure 1994|church|3|21-07-1994|maintained=y|archived=n|A Measure passed by the General Synod of the Church of England to consolidate with amendments the provisions concerning legal aid contained in the Church of England (Legal Aid and Miscellaneous Provisions) Measure 1988.}}
|-
| {{|Team and Group Ministries Measure 1995|church|1|28-06-1995|maintained=y|archived=n|A Measure passed by the General Synod of the Church of England to make further provision with respect to team and group ministries.}}
|-
| {{|Church of England (Miscellaneous Provisions) Measure 1995|church|2|19-07-1995|maintained=y|archived=n|A Measure passed by the General Synod of the Church of England to make it lawful for Church of Ireland ministers to officiate in England; to provide for the appointment of lay canons in the Cathedral Church of Christ in Oxford; to enable the designation of archdeacon emeritus to be conferred; to amend the law relating to the resignation of deans, residentiary canons and archdeacons; to amend section 27 of the Ecclesiastical Commissioners Act 1840, section 6 of the Church Commissioners Measure 1947, the Schedule to the Church Funds Investment Measure 1958, section 21 of the Clergy Pensions Measure 1961, sections 2, 3 and 27 of and Schedule 1 to the Ecclesiastical Jurisdiction Measure 1963, section 20 of the Parochial Registers and Records Measure 1978, sections 9, 44, 51 and 87 of and Schedule 1 to the Pastoral Measure 1983, section 8 of the Church of England (Miscellaneous Provisions) Measure 1983 and section 6 of the Care of Churches and Ecclesiastical Jurisdiction Measure 1991; to amend certain enactments in connection with the procedure of the General Synod; and for purposes connected therewith.}}
|-
| {{|Pensions Measure 1997|church|1|21-03-1997|maintained=y|archived=n|A Measure passed by the General Synod of the Church of England to make further provision in relation to pensions and related benefits for certain persons who are or have been in the service of the Church of England and their widows, widowers and dependants.}}
|-
| {{|National Institutions Measure 1998|church|1|02-07-1998|maintained=y|archived=n|A Measure passed by the General Synod of the Church of England to make better provision for the establishment and functions of the national institutions of the Church of England and for the management of the assets thereof; and for purposes connected therewith.}}
|-
| {{|Cathedrals Measure 1999|church|1|30-06-1999|maintained=y|archived=n|A Measure passed by the General Synod of the Church of England to make further provision with respect to the constitution, statutes and administration of cathedrals.}}
|-
| {{|Care of Places of Worship Measure 1999|church|2|30-06-1999|maintained=y|archived=n|A Measure passed by the General Synod of the Church of England to make provision in relation to the care of certain buildings used for or in connection with worship; and for purposes connected therewith.}}
|-
| {{|Church of England (Miscellaneous Provisions) Measure 2000|church|1|28-07-2000|maintained=y|archived=n|A Measure passed by the General Synod of the Church of England to transfer certain functions of the Church Commissioners to diocesan bodies; to make provision for the performance of a rural dean's functions during a vacancy, absence or illness; to enable dioceses to re-name rural deans as area deans; to amend section 1 of the Consecration of Churchyards Act 1867; to amend section 12(10) of the City of London (Guild Churches) Act 1952; to amend the Schedule to the Church Funds Investment Measure 1958; to amend section 8 of the Ecclesiastical Jurisdiction Measure 1963; to amend section 21 of the Repair of Benefice Buildings Measure 1972; to amend section 4 of the Ecclesiastical Fees Measure 1986; to amend section 3 of the Patronage (Benefices) Measure 1986; to amend section 6 of the Church of England (Legal Aid and Miscellaneous Provisions) Measure 1988; to repeal certain enactments which are no longer of practical utility; and for purposes connected therewith.}}
|-
| {{|Churchwardens Measure 2001|church|1|10-04-2001|maintained=y|archived=n|A Measure passed by the General Synod of the Church of England to make fresh provision with respect to churchwardens in the Church of England.}}
|-
| {{|Synodical Government (Amendment) Measure 2003|church|1|06-03-2003|maintained=y|archived=n|A Measure passed by the General Synod of the Church of England to amend the law relating to synodical government and for purposes connected therewith.}}
|-
| {{|Church of England (Pensions) Measure 2003|church|2|06-03-2003|maintained=y|archived=n|A Measure passed by the General Synod of the Church of England to make provision for a General Purposes Fund of the Church of England Pensions Board and to amend the Clergy Pensions Measure 1961 and the Pensions Measure 1977; and for connected purposes.}}
|-
| {{|Clergy Discipline Measure 2003|church|3|10-07-2003|maintained=y|archived=n|A Measure passed by the General Synod of the Church of England to amend the law relating to ecclesiastical discipline, to amend section 3 of the Ecclesiastical Jurisdiction Measure 1963 and section 5(5) of the Ecclesiastical Judges and Legal Officers Measure 1976, and for purposes connected therewith.}}
|-
| {{|Stipends (Cessation of Special Payments) Measure 2005|church|1|24-03-2005|maintained=y|archived=n|A Measure passed by the General Synod of the Church of England to provide for the cessation of guaranteed annuities payable by the Church Commissioners to incumbents and certain other payments made to dioceses; to provide for the application of sums made available in consequence thereof; and for connected purposes.}}
|-
| {{|Care of Cathedrals (Amendment) Measure 2005|church|2|24-03-2005|maintained=y|archived=n|A Measure passed by the General Synod of the Church of England to amend the Care of Cathedrals Measure 1990 and the Cathedrals Measure 1999; and for connected purposes.}}
|-
| {{|Church of England (Miscellaneous Provisions) Measure 2005|church|3|24-03-2005|maintained=y|archived=n|A Measure passed by the General Synod of the Church of England to amend the Parsonages Measure 1938; to amend sections 6 and 11 of the Church Commissioners Measure 1947; to repeal section 7 of the Diocesan Stipends Funds Measure 1953; to amend section 8 of the Parochial Church Councils (Powers) Measure 1956; to amend section 20 of the Church Property (Miscellaneous Provisions) Measure 1960; to amend the Repair of Benefice Buildings Measure 1972; to amend the Endowments and Glebe Measure 1976; to amend the Pastoral Measure 1983; to make provision for the appointment of diocesan secretaries; and for purposes connected therewith.}}
|-
| {{|Church of England (Miscellaneous Provisions) Measure 2006|church|1|11-07-2006|maintained=y|archived=n|A Measure passed by the General Synod of the Church of England to amend the Parsonages Measure 1938; to amend the Church Commissioners Measure 1947; to amend the Diocesan Stipends Funds Measure 1953; to amend section 2 of the Church Funds Investment Measure 1958; to amend section 7 of the Church Property (Miscellaneous Provisions) Measure 1960; to make new provision for the powers of the Church Commissioners relating to Farnham Castle; to amend the Ecclesiastical Jurisdiction Measure 1963; to amend Schedule 2 to the Synodical Government Measure 1969; to amend the Repair of Benefice Buildings Measure 1972; to amend the Endowments and Glebe Measure 1976; to amend section 8 of the Church of England (Miscellaneous Provisions) Measure 1978; to amend the Pastoral Measure 1983; to amend the National Institutions Measure 1998; and for purposes connected therewith.}}
|-
| {{|Pastoral (Amendment) Measure 2006|church|2|11-07-2006|maintained=y|archived=n|A Measure passed by the General Synod of the Church of England to enable leases to be granted of parts of churches and of land belonging or annexed to a church and for connected purposes.}}
|-
| {{|Dioceses, Pastoral and Mission Measure 2007|church|1|30-10-2007|maintained=y|archived=n|A Measure passed by the General Synod of the Church of England to further the mission of the Church of England and, in particular, to make new provision, in place of the Dioceses Measure 1978 and section 8 of the Church of England (Miscellaneous Provisions) Measure 1983, for reviewing the provincial and diocesan structure of the Church of England and for making reorganisation schemes, for the change of name of sees, and for the creation and filling of suffragan sees, for the nomination of suffragan bishops and the delegation of functions to them and to other persons in episcopal orders and for the discharge of functions of certain diocesan bodies; to amend the Pastoral Measure 1983 in respect of the making of pastoral schemes and orders and of schemes for the closure of churches for regular public worship; to enable a diocesan bishop, by order, to endorse and make provision for mission initiatives; to make new provision for mission and pastoral committees; to replace the Council for the Care of Churches with a body named the Church Buildings Council and make new provision for it; to make provision for the description of assistant curates and for their functions; to make other amendments to the Pastoral Measure 1983; and for connected purposes.}}
|-
| {{|Church of England Marriage Measure 2008|church|1|22-05-2008|maintained=y|archived=n|A Measure passed by the General Synod of the Church of England to enable persons to be married in a place of worship in a parish with which they have a qualifying connection; and for connected purposes.}}
|-
| {{|Ecclesiastical Offices (Terms of Service) Measure 2009|church|1|02-04-2009|maintained=y|archived=n|A Measure passed by the General Synod of the Church of England to make new provision for the terms of service of the holders of ecclesiastical offices; and for purposes connected therewith.}}
|-
| {{|Church of England Pensions (Amendment) Measure 2009|church|2|02-04-2009|maintained=y|archived=n|A Measure passed by the General Synod of the Church of England to extend from 31st December 2011 to 31st December 2018 the expiry of the period within which the Church Commissioners may make capital payments towards the cost of lump sums and pensions due to be paid or payable under certain pension and superannuation schemes; and for connected purposes.}}
|-
| {{|Church of England (Miscellaneous Provisions) Measure 2010|church|1|18-03-2010|maintained=y|archived=n|A Measure to amend the New Parishes Measure 1943; to amend section 6 of the Church Commissioners Measure 1947; to amend section 2 of the Church Funds Investment Measure 1958; to amend section 21 of the Clergy Pensions Measure 1961; to amend section 2 of the Ecclesiastical Jurisdiction Measure 1963; to amend the Endowments and Glebe Measure 1976; to amend section 69 of the Pastoral Measure 1983; to amend Schedule 1 to the National Institutions Measure 1998; to amend section 24 of the Commons Act 2006; to make provision for gifts made to or for the benefit of the Church of England; to make provision for the status of corporate bodies of cathedrals and new provision with respect to canons in Christ Church cathedral; and for purposes connected therewith.}}
|-
| {{|Vacancies in Suffragan Sees and Other Ecclesiastical Offices Measure 2010|church|2|18-03-2010|maintained=y|archived=n|A Measure to amend the law with respect to the appointment of suffragan bishops; and with respect to appointments to fill vacancies in certain ecclesiastical offices to which Her Majesty has the right of presentation.}}
|-
| {{|Crown Benefices (Parish Representatives) Measure 2010|church|3|18-03-2010|maintained=y|archived=n|A Measure to make provision for the appointment of lay parish representatives to approve the selection of incumbents of certain Crown benefices.}}
|-
| {{|Care of Cathedrals Measure 2011|church|1|24-05-2011|maintained=y|archived=n|A Measure passed by the General Synod of the Church of England to consolidate, with corrections and minor improvements, the Care of Cathedrals Measure 1990, the Care of Cathedrals (Supplementary Provisions) Measure 1994 and the Care of Cathedrals (Amendment) Measure 2005, and related enactments.}}
|-
| {{|Ecclesiastical Fees (Amendment) Measure 2011|church|2|24-05-2011|maintained=y|archived=n|A Measure passed by the General Synod of the Church of England to make further provision with respect to ecclesiastical fees; to amend the constitution of the Fees Advisory Commission and the provisions for certain annual fees; and for purposes connected therewith.}}
|-
| {{|Mission and Pastoral Measure 2011|church|3|24-05-2011|maintained=y|archived=n|A Measure passed by the General Synod of the Church of England to consolidate with corrections and minor improvements the Pastoral Measure 1983 and Parts 3, 4, 5 and 6 and section 61 of the Dioceses, Pastoral and Mission Measure 2007, and related enactments which are designed to make better provision for the cure of souls.}}
|-
| {{|Church of England Marriage (Amendment) Measure 2012|church|1|19-12-2012|maintained=y|archived=n|A Measure passed by the General Synod of the Church of England to amend the Church of England Marriage Measure 2008 to widen the conditions for establishing the qualifying connections of persons intending to be married in certain cases and to provide for the form of banns of matrimony where the form set out in the Book of Common Prayer is not used and for the time of the publication of banns; and for connected purposes.}}
|-
| {{|Diocese in Europe Measure 2013|church|1|26-03-2013|maintained=y|archived=n|A Measure passed by the General Synod of the Church of England to make further provision for the Diocese in Europe.}}
|-
| {{|Clergy Discipline (Amendment) Measure 2013|church|2|26-03-2013|maintained=y|archived=n|A Measure passed by the General Synod of the Church of England to amend the Clergy Discipline Measure 2003; and for connected purposes.}}
|-
| {{|Church of England (Miscellaneous Provisions) Measure 2014|church|1|14-05-2014|maintained=y|archived=n|A Measure passed by the General Synod of the Church of England to amend section 67 of the Ecclesiastical Commissioners Act 1840; to amend section 25 of the Burial Act 1857; to amend section 5 of the Episcopal Endowments and Stipends Measure 1943; to amend the Church Commissioners Measure 1947; to amend the Parochial Church Councils (Powers) Measure 1956; to amend the Clergy Pensions Measure 1961; to amend sections 2 and 3 of the Ecclesiastical Jurisdiction Measure 1963; to amend section 3 of the Faculty Jurisdiction Measure 1964; to amend the Overseas and Other Clergy (Ministry and Ordination) Measure 1967; to amend the Synodical Government Measure 1969; to amend the Endowments and Glebe Measure 1976; to amend the Incumbents (Vacation of Benefices) Measure 1977; to amend the Patronage (Benefices) Measure 1986; to amend the Care of Churches and Ecclesiastical Jurisdiction Measure 1991; to amend the Cathedrals Measure 1999; to confer power on chancellors to determine fees; to extend the powers of the General Cemetery Company; to make provision for Christ Church, Oxford; to make provision for the tenure of office of vicars general and surrogates; to amend the Dioceses, Pastoral and Mission Measure 2007; to make minor and consequential amendments to other enactments; and for connected purposes.}}
|-
| {{|Bishops and Priests (Consecration and Ordination of Women) Measure 2014|church|2|23-10-2014|maintained=y|archived=n|A Measure passed by the General Synod of the Church of England to make provision for the consecration of women as bishops and for the continuation of provision for the ordination of women as priests; to repeal the Priests (Ordination of Women) Measure 1993; and for connected purposes.}}
|-
| {{|Care of Churches and Ecclesiastical Jurisdiction (Amendment) Measure 2015|church|1|12-02-2015|maintained=y|archived=n|A Measure passed by the General Synod of the Church of England to amend the Care of Churches and Ecclesiastical Jurisdiction Measure 1991 and the Ecclesiastical Jurisdiction Measure 1963.}}
|-
| {{|Ecclesiastical Property Measure 2015|church|2|12-02-2015|maintained=y|archived=n|A Measure passed by the General Synod of the Church of England to amend the law relating to certain ecclesiastical land and personal property held for ecclesiastical purposes.}}
|-
| {{|Church of England (Pensions) (Amendment) Measure 2015|church|3|12-02-2015|maintained=y|archived=n|A Measure passed by the General Synod of the Church of England to extend until 31 December 2025 the period within which the Church Commissioners may make capital payments towards the cost of lump sums and pensions due to be paid or payable under certain pension and superannuation schemes; and for connected purposes.}}
|-
| {{|Safeguarding and Clergy Discipline Measure 2016|church|1|16-03-2016|maintained=y|archived=n|A Measure passed by the General Synod of the Church of England to make provision about safeguarding children and vulnerable adults; and to amend the Clergy Discipline Measure 2003.}}
|-
| {{|Diocesan Stipends Funds (Amendment) Measure 2016|church|2|16-03-2016|maintained=y|archived=n|A Measure passed by the General Synod of the Church of England to enable the capital account of a diocesan stipends fund to be invested on a total return basis.}}
|-
| {{|Statute Law (Repeals) Measure 2018|church|1|10-05-2018|maintained=y|archived=n|A Measure passed by the General Synod of the Church of England to repeal certain enactments of ecclesiastical law which (except in so far as their effect is preserved) are no longer of practical utility.}}
|-
| {{|Pensions (Pre-consolidation) Measure 2018|church|2|10-05-2018|maintained=y|archived=n|A Measure passed by the General Synod of the Church of England to make amendments of provisions relating to Church of England pensions designed to facilitate, or which are otherwise desirable in connection with, the consolidation of the legislation on that subject.}}
|-
| {{|Ecclesiastical Jurisdiction and Care of Churches Measure 2018|church|3|10-05-2018|maintained=y|archived=n|A Measure passed by the General Synod of the Church of England to consolidate with corrections and minor improvements certain enactments relating to ecclesiastical jurisdiction and the care of churches and other places of worship.}}
|-
| {{|Mission and Pastoral etc. (Amendment) Measure 2018|church|4|10-05-2018|maintained=y|archived=n|A Measure passed by the General Synod of the Church of England to amend and simplify certain provisions of the Mission and Pastoral Measure 2011, the Endowments and Glebe Measure 1976 and the Patronage (Benefices) Measure 1986; to make minor clarificatory amendments; and for connected purposes.}}
|-
| {{|Legislative Reform Measure 2018|church|5|10-05-2018|maintained=y|archived=n|A Measure passed by the General Synod of the Church of England to enable provision to be made for the purpose of removing or reducing burdens resulting from ecclesiastical legislation; and to enable provision to be made for the purpose of facilitating consolidations of ecclesiastical legislation.}}
|-
| {{|Ecumenical Relations Measure 2018|church|6|20-12-2018|maintained=y|archived=n|A Measure passed by the General Synod of the Church of England to make provision about ecumenical relations.}}
|-
| {{|Church of England (Miscellaneous Provisions) Measure 2018|church|7|20-12-2018|maintained=y|archived=n|A Measure passed by the General Synod of the Church of England to make miscellaneous provision relating to matters concerning the Church of England.}}
|-
| {{|Church Property Measure 2018|church|8|20-12-2018|maintained=y|archived=n|A Measure passed by the General Synod of the Church of England to consolidate with corrections and minor improvements the Parsonages Measure 1938, the New Parishes Measure 1943, the Parsonages (Amendment) Measure 1947, certain provisions of the Church Property (Miscellaneous Provisions) Measure 1960 and the Endowments and Glebe Measure 1976 and certain other provisions relating to Church property.}}
|-
| {{|Church of England Pensions Measure 2018|church|9|20-12-2018|maintained=y|archived=n|A Measure passed by the General Synod of the Church of England to consolidate with corrections and minor improvements certain enactments relating to Church of England pensions.}}
|-
| {{|Church Representation and Ministers Measure 2019|church|1|04-07-2019|maintained=y|archived=n|A Measure passed by the General Synod of the Church of England to make provision about Church representation and ministers.}}
|-
| {{|Church of England (Miscellaneous Provisions) Measure 2020|church|1|16-03-2020|maintained=y|archived=n|A Measure passed by the General Synod of the Church of England to make miscellaneous provision relating to matters concerning the Church of England.}}
|-
| {{|Channel Islands Measure 2020|church|2|22-07-2020|maintained=y|archived=n|A Measure passed by the General Synod of the Church of England to make provision for enabling the attachment of the Channel Islands to the diocese of Salisbury; to make further provision for the application of Church Measures to the Channel Islands; and to make further provision for Church representation for the Channel Islands}}
|-
| {{|General Synod (Remote Meetings) (Temporary Standing Orders) Measure 2020|church|3|04-11-2020|maintained=y|archived=n|A Measure passed by the General Synod of the Church of England to make provision enabling remote meetings of the General Synod.}}
|-
| {{|Diocesan Boards of Education Measure 2021|church|1|29-04-2021|maintained=y|archived=n|A Measure passed by the General Synod of the Church of England to make provision about Diocesan Boards of Education.}}
|-
| {{|Cathedrals Measure 2021|church|2|29-04-2021|maintained=y|archived=n|A Measure passed by the General Synod of the Church of England to make provision about the governance, management, property and financial affairs of cathedrals.}}
|-
| {{|Safeguarding (Code of Practice) Measure 2021|church|3|20-10-2021|maintained=y|archived=n|A Measure passed by the General Synod of the Church of England to make provision for a code of practice on safeguarding children and vulnerable adults.}}
}}

See also
List of Church of England Instruments

Notes

References
 Chronological Table of the Statutes
 The Public General Acts and Church Assembly Measures (exact title varies) (various years)

External links
  Measures of the General Synod
 

{{|Convocations of the Clergy Measure 1920|church|1|23-12-1920|maintained=y|archived=n|A Measure passed by the National Assembly of the Church of England declaring the Power of each of the Convocations of Canterbury and York to Amend the Constitution of the Lower House thereof.}}

{{|Parochial Church Councils (Powers) Measure 1921|church|1|01-07-1921|archived=n|A Measure passed by the National Assembly of the Church of England to confer powers on Parochial Church Councils and to amend the law relating to the parochial organisation of the Church of England, and for other purposes connected therewith.}}

Church of England ecclesiastical polity
Church of England legislation
Church of England lists
Marriage, unions and partnerships in England